Events from the year 1974 in North Korea.

Incumbents
Premier: Kim Il 
Supreme Leader: Kim Il-sung

Events

Births

 24 July - Ham Pong-sil.

See also
Years in Japan
Years in South Korea

References

 
North Korea
1970s in North Korea
Years of the 20th century in North Korea
North Korea